Imre Gelencsér (born 24 August 1960) is a Hungarian judoka. He competed in the men's half-lightweight event at the 1980 Summer Olympics.

References

External links
 

1960 births
Living people
Hungarian male judoka
Olympic judoka of Hungary
Judoka at the 1980 Summer Olympics
Martial artists from Budapest